Killeen Mall is a  shopping mall located in Killeen, Texas located on . It is owned and managed by Jones Lang Lasalle.
The mall opened in 1981 and has 100 stores. The original anchors were Bealls, Sears, and O. G. Wilson Catalog Showroom, owned by Zale Corporation (later Best Products).

Killeen Mall is one of two regional malls in Bell County, with the other being Temple Mall, in nearby Temple.

On December 28, 2018, Sears announced that the Killeen Mall location would be closing in March 2019 as part of a plan to close 80 stores nationwide. The former Sears will become a second Dillard's.

Anchors
JCPenney
Dillard's
Burlington Coat Factory

References

External links
Official website
Jones Lang Lasalle

Shopping malls in Texas
Shopping malls established in 1981
JLL (company)